
Year 131 BC was a year of the pre-Julian Roman calendar. At the time it was known as the Year of the Consulship of Mucianus and Flaccus (or, less frequently, year 623 Ab urbe condita) and the Fourth Year of Yuanguang. The denomination 131 BC for this year has been used since the early medieval period, when the Anno Domini calendar era became the prevalent method in Europe for naming years.

Events 
 By place 

 Roman Republic 
 Aristonicus of Pergamon leads an uprising against Rome, and consul Publius Licinius Crassus Mucianius is killed in the fighting.
 The Roman censor Quintus Caecilius Metellus Macedonicus attempts to remove the tribune Gaius Atinius Labeo Macerio from the Senate, the angry Atinius drags him to be thrown off the Tarpeian Rock, and Metellus is only saved by the intervention of other senators.
 The tribune Gaius Papirius Carbo passes a measure allowing the use of secret ballots in legislative assemblies.
 For the first time in Roman history, both censors are plebeians (Metellus and Quintus Pompeius).
 First Acta Diurna appears in Rome around this time.

Deaths

References